Grant Leep is an American college basketball coach who is currently the head coach of the Seattle Pacific University men's basketball team. As a player, Leep was a 4-year letterman at the University of Washington and a high school All-American at Mount Vernon.

References

Living people
American men's basketball coaches
Year of birth missing (living people)